is a school in Machida, Tokyo, Japan, covering education from primary school to university. The school was founded by influential Japanese education reformer, Kuniyoshi Obara. The school is a member of the Round Square network of schools.

References

External links
 School homepage

Machida, Tokyo
Round Square schools
Schools in Tokyo
School Corporations in Japan